The International Russian Rotary Children's Music Competition is one of the leading events in cultural life of Russian and European youth. The competition take place in the Moscow State Conservatory P. I. Tchaikovsky or other concert halls in Moscow.

This competition was initiated by the President of Rotary Club Moscow International Josef Marous in 2002 and in just 17 years it is giving an important chance to young, talented musicians to become known and to make a serious step in their development as artists. From 2018 on the competition is being organized by RC Moscow East.
The next XVII. competition will be held in the Gnessin Music School in Moscow October 3 and 4, 2020.

Instruments
Piano, violin, violoncello, harp, wind instruments.

Participating countries
Children from Armenia, Australia, Austria, Azerbaijan, Belarus, Belgium, Bulgaria, China, Cuba, Germany, Hungary, England, Estonia, France, Hong Kong, Ireland, Israel, Italy, Republic of Korea, Democratic People's Republic of Korea, Latvia, Lithuania, Mexico, Moldova, Montenegro, Norway, Poland, Romania, Russia, Serbia, Singapore, Slovenia, Sweden, Spain, South African Republic, Ukraine, Uzbekistan, USA and Vietnam have already participated in International Russian Rotary Music Competition.

Jury
Members of the jury were People's Artist of the USSR, Professor of Moscow Conservatory, soloist of Moscow Philarmony, Art Director and Conductor of Chamber Orchestra Moskovia Eduard Grach, national artist of Russia and chief conductor of the Moscow State Philharmonic Orchestra Pavel Kogan, People's Artist of Russia, honored Artist of the USSR Dimitri Bashkirov, People's Artist of Russia Vladimir Ovchinnikov, President of EMCY Eckart Rohlfs, national artist of the USSR Natalia Gutman, People's Artist of Russia, Professor of Tchaikovsky Moscow State Conservatory Dmitriy Miller, Merited Artist of Russia, Professor of Tchaikovsky Moscow State Conservatory Kseniya Knorre, Merited Artist of the Russian Federation, director of the Gnessin Music School Mikhail Khokhlov.

Advisory board
Victor Akulian, Russian, Partner of the Audit Department of KPMG in Russia and CIS
Dmitri Bashkirov, Russian, National Artist of Russia, honored artist of the RSFSR, Professor at the Escuella Superior de Musica Reina Sophia in Madrid, Spain.
Yuri Bashmet, Russian, National Artist of the USSR, artistic director and chief conductor of the State Symphonic orchestra ,, Novaya Rossiya,, and chamber orchestra ,, Moscowm Soloists,,.
Tiberius Braun, German, Chairman of the organizing committee, Past-President of RCMI, Chief Representative of TUI (Germany) in RF, PHF
Eduard Grach, Russian, National artist of the USSR, Professor of Tchaikovsky Moscow State Conservatory, soloist of Moscow Philharmonic Society, Art Director and conductor of chamber orchestra “Moskovia”.
Ottokar Hahn, German, Vorsitzender des Europäischen Freundeskreises des Julius-Stern-Instituts der Universität der Künste Berlin e.V., Ambassador of the European Commission in Moscow, 1996–1999, Minister of European and Federal Affairs in Saarland, 1985–1990
Mikhail Khokhlov, Russian, Director of Gnesin School of Music, honored worker of arts in RF, Honored Artist of Russia.
Pavel Kogan, Russian, Chief conductor of the State Moscow Symphony Orchestra, National artist of Russia
Sergey Lavrov, Russian, Minister of Foreign Affairs of the Russian Federation.
Josef Marous, French/German, Chairman of the Advisory Board, Co-Chairman of the organizing committee. Past-President of Rotary Club Moscow International (RCMI), Past Deputy General Director of OAO TMK, Past Chief representative of ThyssenKrupp in Russia, PHF, Chairman of the Marous Stiftung.
Daniel Pollack, USA, Professor at the University of Southern California, Thornton School of Music, Past visiting Professor of The Juilliard School, Columbia University and Yale’s School of Music, Prize winner of the International Tchaikovsky Piano Competition in Moscow 1958, Participant in the juries of International Tchaikovsky Piano Competition, Moscow; Queen Elizabeth, Brussel; Hamamatsu and Sonoda Competitions in Japan; Prokofiev Competition in St. Petersburg; Rachmaninoff Competition, Moscow; UNISA Pretoria, South Africa; Gina Bachauer Competition, Salt Lake City; Ciurlionis Competition, Vilnius.
Vladimir Spivakov, Russian, National artist of the USSR, Conductor of the Orchestra “Moscow Virtuosi”
Yoshinori Sasaki, Japanese, General director of Yamaha in Russia
Alexander Yakupov, Russian, Director of the Russian State Special Academy of Arts,, Art Director of opera-house Moscow State Conservatory, member of the International Academy of Informatization, honored worker of arts in RF, Doctor of fine art, Professor.

Laureates
2002
Roman Kim, Korea/Kazachstan, violin; Vladimir Kozhukhin, Russia, piano; Emma Alikova, Russia, violin; Tatiana Shalaginova, Russia, violin; Dmitry Shishkin, Russia, piano; Dmitry Maiboroda, Russia, piano
2004
Anna Denisova, Russia, piano; Mikhail Mering, Russia, clarinet; Anastasia Vorotnaya, Russia, piano; Elena Ilyinskaya, Russia, violin
2005
Narek Arutyunyan, Armenia, clarinet; Sergey Balyavskiy, Russia, piano; Dmitry Smirnov, Russia, violin; Rimma Benyumova, Russia, violin; Anastasia Kobekina, Russia, violoncello; Timur Nardinov, Russia, flute
2006
Anna Savkina, Russia, violin; Ekaterina Rybina, Russia, piano; Eleonora Makhmudova, Russia, piano; Elena Prosolupova, Russia, violin; Julia Vanyushina, Russia, piano; Katariina Maria Kits, Estonia, violin
2007
Alexandra Lee, Korea/Russia, violin; Vsevolod Brigida, Russia, piano; Christina Toroschina, Ukraine, violin; Anastasia Sokolova, Russia, piano; Dmitry Umerenkov, Russia, piano; Ekaterina Kornishina, Russia, flute; Elizaveta Irgasheva, Russia, piano
2008
Martin Garcia, Spain, piano; Ruslan Shainazarov, Russia, piano; Dmitry Tyurin, Russia, piano, Sarah Zajtman, France, piano; Arseniy Bardovskiy, Russia, flute; Anastasia Pentina, Russia, violin; Tsoi Se Pel, Korea, violin
2009
Yeagy Park, USA, violin; Georgy Krizhenko, Russia, piano; Naina Kobzareva, Russia, violin; Viktor Maslov, Russia, piano; Judith Stapf, Germany, violin, Tamara Popova, Moldova, piano
2010
Pak Di Na, Korea/Russia, flute; Taelia-Yaroslavna Aggejalfis, Russia, harp; Lee Jelin, Korea, violin; Anastasia Egorenkova, Russia, piano; Mark Prikhodko, Belarus, violoncello; Arseniy Mun, Russia, piano
2011
Matvey Sherling, Russia, Saxophone; Roman Boldyrev, Russia, piano; Rodion Synchyshin, Ukraine, violin, Andrey Zabavnikov, Russia, violin; Marja Tikhomirova, Russia, piano; Daria Kalyuzhnaya, Russia, violoncello
2012
Arina Pan, Russia, piano; Marusya Matveeva, Russia, piano; Inga Rodina, Russia, violin; Patricia Bloma, Latvia, saxophone; Danila Vladyko, Russia, violoncello
2013
Yi Ting Ong, Singapore, flute; Mariamna Sherling, Russia, piano; Maria Andreeva, Russia, piano; Robert Neumann, Germany, piano; Polina Tarasenko, Ukraine, trombone, Daniel Lozakovitj, Sweden, violin
2014
Joshua Noronha, Australia, piano; Mikhail Usov, Russia, violin; Sofia Yakovenko, Ukraine, violin; Hasan Denisov-Ignatov, Bulgaria, piano; Anastasia Ivanova, Russia, piano; Sergey Khvorostyanov, Russia, bassoon; Olga Davnis, Russia, piano
2015
Leia Zhu, England, violin; Andrey Varlamov, Russia, Oboe; Varvara Agaeva, Russia, violin; Andrey Ryazantsev, Russia, clarinet; Egor Oparin, Russia, piano; Jennifer Pabebianco del Monaco, Spain, violin.
 2016
Park Boogyeom, Korea, violin; Matvey Blumin, Russia, violin; Sofia Mekhonoshina, Russia, clarinet; Elena Krivorotova, Russia, flute; Anastasia Ivchenko, Russia, piano; Daniil Bessonov, Russia, violin.
2017
Alexander Daviduk, Russia, piano; Stephania Pospekhina, Russia, violin; Milena Piorunska, Poland, violin; Dmitry Pinchuk, Russia, saxophone; Alexander Rublev, Russia, trumpet; Alisa Shishkova, Russia, oboe; Sophia Firsova, Russia, violin.
 2019
Dmitriy Melkumov, oboe; Ivan Chepkin, piano; Sofia Koltakova, violin; Polina Cherkasova, piano; Camilla Soboleva, flute; Yelisey Kosolapov, violin; Artiom Rychagov, violin; Tikhon Evlanov, violoncello; Semion Salomatnikov, trumpet.

External links
The official site of the Competition

Rotary International
Piano competitions
Music competitions in Russia